Jean-Claude Lebensztejn is a French art historian and art critic, formerly a professor at University of Paris I-Pantéon-Sorbonne. Lebensztejn is one of the most remarkable representatives of the now older generation of French art theorists, sometimes cited as a pioneer of structuralism. His contribution to a historically critical evaluation of sources for 20th-century art is considerable; see his recent book on Cézanne (Paris 2005).

References

Locus focus: Jean-Pierre Criqui talks with Jean-Claude Lebensztejn - Interview by Jean-Pierre Criqui, in: ArtForum,  June, 2003

Living people
Academic staff of the University of Paris
French art historians
French male non-fiction writers
Year of birth missing (living people)